Our Lady of the Annunciation of Clear Creek Abbey or Clear Creek Abbey is a Benedictine Abbey in the Ozark Mountains near Hulbert in Cherokee County, Oklahoma. It is located in the Diocese of Tulsa.

Origins 
The monastery traces its roots to the Abbey of Fontgombault in France. Thirty-one American Catholic men, seeking to live the full Benedictine life, went to Abbey of Our Lady of the Assumption at Fontgombault, France, which is a monastery of the Solesmes Congregation. In 1999, seven of these men, now monks from Fontgombault, along with six other monks from Canada and France, established a community near Hulbert, Oklahoma at the invitation of Bishop Edward James Slattery. Clear Creek is the second monastery of the Solesmes Congregation established in the United States; the first is a house of nuns at Westfield, Vermont. The monastery is being built in phases, and until the church was finished, Masses were said in the crypt.

Abbey Community 
In February 2010, Clear Creek Abbey gained abbatial status. It uses the 1962 Roman Missal. The choir is well known for its Gregorian chant. Its first abbot, as of 2010, is Dom Philip Anderson, who had been the prior since the monastery's founding. He has said, "We just follow the old monastic life. We pray, worship and do manual labor and give counseling to people... There's a whole culture war going on and a series of disappointments with the Catholic Church in America. People look to this monastery as a new beginning, as a new element that has a solid backing in a long tradition of monastic life."

Clear Creek is currently actively recruiting to its full capacity of 60-70 monks. As of 2003, there were 22 monks, while by 2013, there were over 40. The community currently numbers 50 monks.  In recent years, a community of lay families has started to gather around the abbey.

The monastery is also actively fundraising, having raised $4 million (as of 2003) of a target of $32 million. After a large gift was received in 2009, construction on the church moved forward in 2011.  The west façade, the nave, and the transept were raised to half their intended height.  A roof was put over this new structure, allowing it to be used as a church.  In 2013 the schematic architectural plans for the remaining buildings were completed.  A contract for the construction of the church’s eastern portion, or chevet, was signed on March 10, 2016. They have a special relationship with the Little Sisters Disciples of the Lamb.

See also
List of communities using the Tridentine Mass

References

External links 
Clear Creek Monastery official website
Thomas Gordon Smith Architects: building the monastery
2003 Washington Times Article on the monastery
Article about the founding of the monastery
Another article about the monastery's beginnings
Article about the Kansas professors whose students founded the monastery
Article about their educational approach.
Tulsa World article on Brother Joseph-Marie Owen raising sheep
Column about the monastery by a Nebraskan bishop
Interview with Dom  Philip Anderson: We Must All Build Bridges

Benedictine monasteries in the United States
Communities using the Tridentine Mass
Christian organizations established in 1999
20th-century Christian monasteries
Buildings and structures in Cherokee County, Oklahoma
Roman Catholic Diocese of Tulsa
Cherokee County, Oklahoma
1999 establishments in Oklahoma